East Central German or East Middle German is the eastern non-Franconian Central German language and is part of High German. Present-day Standard German as a High German variant, has actually developed from a compromise of East Central (especially Upper Saxon that was promoted by Johann Christoph Gottsched) and East Franconian German. East Central German dialects are mainly spoken in Central Germany and parts of Brandenburg, and were formerly also spoken in Silesia and Bohemia.

Dialects 
East Central German is spoken in large parts of what is today known as the cultural area of Central Germany (Mitteldeutschland).

It comprises according to Glottolog:
 Central East Middle German
 High Prussian (Hochpreußisch) (nearly extinct)
 Thuringian (Thüringisch)
 Upper Saxon (Obersächsisch)
 Anhaltisch
 Meißnisch
 Osterländisch
 Westlausitzisch
 Erzgebirgisch
 Nordobersäschisch-Südmärkisch
 North Upper Saxon (Nordobersächsisch)
 South Marchian (Südmärkisch)
 Schlesisch–Wilmesau
 Silesian (Schlesisch) (nearly extinct)
 Old Zipser (Altzipserisch)
 Wymysorys
 Yiddish
 Eastern Yiddish
 Western Yiddish

Another division is:
  (East Middle German, East Central German)
  (Thuringian)
  (Central Thuringian)
  (West Thuringian)
  (East Thuringian)
  (North Thuringian)
 
 
 
 
  (Upper Saxon)
  (Erzbergisch)
  (West Erzbergisch)
  (East Erzbergisch)
  (Vorerzbergisch)
  (South Meißnisch), included in Erzgebirgisch or Meißnisch
 
  (South-East Meißnisch)
  (West Meißnisch)
  (North Meißnisch)
  (North-East Meißnisch)
  (North Upper Saxon)
 
 
 
 
  or 
  (Lausitzisch, literally Lusatian)
  (Upper Lausitzisch)
  (New Lausitzisch)
  (West Lausitzisch)
  (East Lausitzisch)
  (Low Lausitzisch)
  (South Märkisch)
  (New Märkisch)
  (Silesian)
  (Mountain Silesian)
 
 
 
  (South-East Silesian)
 
 
 
  (Middle Silesian, lit. Middle or Central Silesian)
  (West Silesian)
 
  (Bohemian)
  (East Egerländisch)
  (North-West Bohemian)
  (North Bohemian)
  (North-East Bohemian)
  (lit. North Moravian)
 
 
  (lit. Central North Moravian)
  (High Prussian)
 
 
  (North Oberländisch)

See also 
 West Central German

References 

Central German languages
German dialects
Languages of Germany